Robin Swann (born 24 September 1971) is a politician from Northern Ireland. Northern Ireland's 
Minister of Health from Jan 2020 to Oct 2022, he was the leader of the Ulster Unionist Party from 2017 to 2019.

Swann was first elected to the Northern Ireland Assembly at the 2011 election, representing North Antrim, and was re-elected in 2016, 2017 and 2022.

From 6 April 2012, he served as Ulster Unionist Chief Whip, a position he retained until he was elected unopposed as UUP leader in April 2017. He resigned as UUP leader in November 2019. Swann stood as the UUP candidate in North Antrim in the December 2019 general election, which saw their vote more than double to 18.5%, taking the party to second place in the constituency. In 2020, he was appointed Minister of Health and presided over the response of the Northern Ireland Executive to the COVID-19 Pandemic.

Political activity
Elected to the Northern Ireland Assembly on 7 May 2011, he successfully defended his seat in the 2016 Assembly election and at the snap election in March 2017, where he was the first unionist elected in North Antrim.

During the short 2016 Assembly mandate he was Chairperson of the Public Accounts Committee which commenced the Inquiry into the RHI scandal. He also served as Chairman of the Committee for Employment and Learning on 27 February 2013, a position he held until the committee was dissolved on 30 April 2016.

He is a member of Kells & Connor Community Association and has served as a board member of the Volunteer Development Agency in Northern Ireland.  Swann has served as president and County Antrim Chairman of the Young Farmers' Clubs of Ulster. He has chaired the YFCU's National Executive and Rural Affairs Committees and has been Chairman of the Rural Youth Europe organisation.

In the 2022 election Swann went on to top the North Antrim poll.
His increased vote was attributed to his work as health minister during the COVID-19 pandemic. Swann credited his success to the work of those in the health service.

Swann was Awarded Politician of the Year 2022, by Civility in Politics, an award he shared with Chris Bryant MP. He nominated three local charities to receive the financial part of the award, Good Morning Ballymena, Good Morning Ballycastle and CAN Ballymoney.

Threats & Court cases
On 2 February 2022 a 44-year-old man was charged with threatening to kill Swann, harassment and improper use of a telecommunications network.

Family and personal life
He and his wife Jennifer have a daughter and a son. Their son was born with a congenital heart defect, and while in Birmingham where a corrective procedure was performed, Swann recorded the events in a personal blog.

References

External links
Northern Ireland Assembly profile
They work for you - Assembly appearances
Ulster Unionist Party profile

1971 births
Living people
Ulster Unionist Party MLAs
Northern Ireland MLAs 2011–2016
Northern Ireland MLAs 2016–2017
Northern Ireland MLAs 2017–2022
Northern Ireland MLAs 2022–2027
21st-century politicians from Northern Ireland
Leaders of the Ulster Unionist Party